Andreas du Plessis de Richelieu (24 February 1852 – 25 March 1932) was a Danish naval officer and businessman who became a Siamese admiral and minister of the navy. He was granted the Thai noble title Phraya Chonlayutthayothin.

He commanded forces at the Phra Chulachomklao Fortress in the Paknam Incident of 13 July 1893, that ended the Franco-Siamese War, and went on to become the first and only foreign-born commander-in-chief of the Royal Thai Navy, from 16 January 1900 to 29 January 1901.

He returned to Denmark in 1902, suffering from malaria. He died at Kokkedal House in Hørsholm and is buried at Holmens Cemetery in Copenhagen.

Botanist Ernst Johannes Schmidt in 1901, circumscribed Richelia, which is a genus of nitrogen-fixing, filamentous, heterocystous and cyanobacteria and named in Richelieu's honour.

Honours and awards
 from Denmark
  Chamberlain and Knight Grand Cross of the Danish Order of the Dannebrog 
 from Siam
  Knight Grand Cross of the Most Exalted Order of the White Elephant
  Knight Commander of the Most Noble Order of the Crown of Siam
  Knight Grand Commander of the Most Illustrious Order of Chula Chom Klao
  Dushdi Mala – Medal for Distinguished Services in Military Affair
  Chakra Mala Medal – Medal for Long Service and Good Conduct
  King Chulalongkorn's Royal Cypher Medal, first class (1901)
 from other countries
 Legion of Honour (France)
 Order of the Redeemer (Greece)
 Order of the Crown of Italy
 Order of the Crown (Prussia)
 Order of Saint Stanislaus (Russia) 
 Order of the Sword (Sweden)
 Order of the Medjidieh (Ottoman Empire) 
 Order of Franz Joseph (Austria-Hungary).

References

External links

 Admiral Andreas du Plessis de Richelieu as Entrepreneur

Danish businesspeople
Danish military personnel
Danish expatriates in Thailand
People from Aabenraa Municipality
Grand Crosses of the Order of the Dannebrog
1852 births
1932 deaths
Order of Chula Chom Klao
Andreas du Plessis de Richelieu
Andreas du Plessis de Richelieu
Recipients of the Legion of Honour
Recipients of the Order of Saint Stanislaus (Russian)
Recipients of the Order of the Sword
Recipients of the Order of the Medjidie
Recipients of the Order of Franz Joseph
Burials at Holmen Cemetery